Euthycera is a genus of flies in the family Sciomyzidae, the marsh flies or snail-killing flies.

Species
E. alaris Vala, 1983
E. algira (Macquart, 1849)
E. alpina (Mayer, 1953)
E. arcuata (Loew, 1859)
E. atomaria (Linnaeus, 1767)
E. chaerophylli (Fabricius, 1798)
E. cribrata (Rondani, 1868)
E. flavostriata (Villeneuve, 1912)
E. formosa (Loew, 1862)
E. fumigata (Scopoli, 1763)
E. guanchica Frey, 1936
E. hrabei Rozkošný, 1969
E. korneyevi Rozkošný, 2006
E. leclercqi Vala & Reidenbach, 1982
E. maculatissima (Strobl, 1906)
E. mehadiensis (Oldenberg, 1923)
E. meleagris Hendel, 1934
E. merzi Rozkošný, 2006
E. mira Knutson & Zuska, 1968
E. morio (Mayer, 1953)
E. nigrescens (Becker, 1907)
E. prominens (Loew, 1847)
E. sardoa Contini & Rivosecchi, 1984
E. seguyi Vala, 1990
E. soror (Robineau-Desvoidy, 1830)
E. stichospila (Czerny, 1909)
E. stictica (Fabricius, 1805)
E. sticticaria (Mayer, 1953)
E. stiticaria (Mayer, 1953)
E. syriaca (Mayer, 1953)
E. vockerothi Rozkošný, 1988
E. zelleri (Loew, 1847)

References

Further reading

External links

 
 

Sciomyzidae
Sciomyzoidea genera